Oho Ou or Ou Hao (born 13 October 1992) is a Chinese actor and singer. He is best known for his role as Zhang Yang in The Left Ear (2015).

Career
In 2012, Ou released his first single "Fake Movement", which won him the "Outstanding Newcomer" award at the Chinese Music Awards. He made his official debut after winning 2nd place in Hunan TV's singing competition Super Boy in 2013. He won the "Most Popular Newcomer" award at the 14th Top Chinese Music Awards.

In 2014, Ou made his acting debut in Hunan TV's music drama Song of Vengeance. He also featured in the comedy film, Temporary Family as his first big screen project.

In 2015, Ou achieved recognition with his role in the youth film The Left Ear by Alec Su. He won the  "Most Anticipated Actor" award at the 16th Chinese Film Media Awards for his performance. The same year, he released his first solo album On His Own and won the "Best All-Rounded Artist" and "Best Trendy Singer" awards at the KU Music Asian Music Awards.

In 2016, Ou starred in the romance film Crying Out in Love, based on the Japanese novel Socrates in Love. He also starred in the crime suspense film Blood of Youth.

In 2017, Ou co-starred in the fantasy epic film Wu Kong and coming-of-age film Fist & Faith. He also starred in the war film The Founding of an Army, playing Ye Ting. The same year, Ou featured in Chen Kaige's fantasy mystery film Legend of the Demon Cat.

In 2018, Ou starred in the fantasy action web drama Hero's Dream.

In 2019, Ou starred in the crime film Vortex, and aviation disaster film The Captain as a pilot. He also featured in disaster film The Bravest, portraying a firefighter; nationalistic film My People, My Country, and Guan Hu's war film  The Eight Hundred. On the small screen, Ou starred in romance drama Love Under the Moon alongside Victoria Song. Forbes China listed Ou under their 30 Under 30 Asia 2019 list which consisted of 30 influential people under 30 years old who have had a substantial effect in their fields.

Filmography

Film

Television series

Variety show

Discography

Albums

Singles

Promotional tracks

Awards and nominations

References

External links 

1992 births
Living people
Male actors from Fuzhou
21st-century Chinese male actors
Chinese male television actors
Chinese male film actors
Super Boy contestants